Shut My Big Mouth is a 1942 American comedy Western film directed by Charles Barton and starring Joe E. Brown.

Plot
A shy horticulturist becomes involved with a local criminal in the old west.

Cast        
 Joe E. Brown as Wellington Holmes
 Adele Mara as Elena Conchita Montoya
 Victor Jory as Buckskin Bill
 Fritz Feld as Robert Oglethorpe
 Don Beddoe as Hill
 Lloyd Bridges as Skinny
 Forrest Tucker as Red 
 Will Wright as Long
 Russell Simpson as Mayor Potter
 Pedro de Cordoba as Don Carlos Montoya
 Joan Woodbury as Maria
 Ralph Peters as Butch
 Joe McGuinn as Hank
 Noble Johnson as Chief Standing Bull
 Chief Thundercloud as Indian Interpreter (as Chief Thunder Cloud)

References

External links
 

1942 films
1940s English-language films
American Western (genre) comedy films
1942 comedy films
Columbia Pictures films
Films directed by Charles Barton
Films scored by John Leipold
American black-and-white films
1940s Western (genre) comedy films
1940s American films